The Education and Inspections Act 2006 (c 40) is an Act of the Parliament of the United Kingdom. According to the government the Act "is intended to represent a major step forward in the Government’s aim of ensuring that all children in all schools get the education they need to enable them to fulfil their potential".

Background to the Act

Trust schools white paper 
In October 2005, the DfES published the White Paper Higher Standards, Better Schools for All — More Choice for Parents and Pupils. It set out plans to "radically improve the system". The blurb distributed with it established a number of key areas that the White Paper was intended to address:

 The challenge to reform
 A school system shaped by parents
 Choice and access for all
 Personalised learning
 Parents driving improvement
 Supporting children and parents
 School discipline
 The school workforce and school leadership
 A new role for local authorities

Trust schools
One of the most controversial elements in the White Paper was the proposal to establish a new breed of school called a Trust school. The White Paper introduced a new term to the educational taxonomy when it explained how schools would "acquire a Trust". It was noted that there was a remarkable similarity between Trust schools and voluntary aided schools/Foundation schools. The proposals allowed for each Trust school to decide its own governance model from either the VA or Foundation model. Local authority assets - buildings and land - would be transferred to trust ownership, and the trust would take on the responsibility for the employment of all the school staff.

The governance model of VA Schools would allow the Trust to directly appoint more than half of the governors allowing it to effectively control the governing body. Such a model would also reduce the number of elected Parent governors. To tackle this obvious reduction in parent power it was proposed that a new consultative body - a Parents’ Council to ensure that parents have a strong voice in decisions about the way the school is run - although it was stressed that statutory guidance on this would be produced at some yet unspecified later stage. This notion effectively killed any suggestion that Kelly could be seen as a champion of parents.

The Trusts were intended to be non-profit making and to have charitable status, although they could be formed by commercial enterprises. In fact one of the early DfES-hosted seminars on the establishment of Trusts included representatives from Microsoft and KPMG. But it was their ability to set their own admission arrangements that generated the most criticism.

Political fallout
The white paper was not received with universal acclaim. A large number of Labour backbenchers, as well as numerous Labour luminaries like Neil Kinnock and former Education Secretary Estelle Morris, made known their opposition to the proposals and published an alternative white paper. Faced with such a rebellion, the government initially stressed that it would press on with the reforms. Tory leader David Cameron then announced that these reforms were in line with Tory policies and that he would support the bill if presented in the proposed form. The government were faced with the prospect of pushing through their reforms only with opposition support and in the face of increased resistance from its own supporters.

Following a report by the Education Select Committee -  which was in itself controversial - Ruth Kelly finally wrote to the committee chairman Barry Sheerman in February 2006, outlining how the bill would look when presented to parliament and stressing how it would accommodate many of the fears expressed in the committee's report. This was reported as the government backtracking on many key issues although it stressed that it was not a climbdown.

The Education and Inspections Bill 2006
On 28 February 2006, the bill was finally published. It contained much of what had been trailed, although most notable by its absence was any mention of "Trust school". In reality, Foundation and Voluntary Aided schools will pick up the mantle of "Trust school".

The Act is designed to give greater freedoms to schools, including the possibility of:
Owning their own assets
Employing their own staff
Setting their own admissions arrangements

Other important provisions include:
Creation of a Local Authority duty to promote fair access to educational opportunities
Giving schools staff a clear statutory right to discipline students
By law, all state (not private) schools must have a behaviour policy in place that includes measures to prevent all forms of bullying among pupils. This policy is decided by the school. All teachers, pupils and parents must be told what it is.
Provisions relating to nutritional standards of school food
Reform of the school inspectorates

See also
Education Act

References

External links
The Education and Inspections Act 2006, as amended from the National Archives.
The Education and Inspections Act 2006, as originally enacted from the National Archives.
Explanatory notes to the Education and Inspections Act 2006.

United Kingdom Acts of Parliament 2006
United Kingdom Education Acts
Education in England
2006 in education